JBG SMITH Properties is a publicly traded real estate investment trust based in Bethesda, Maryland.

As of December 31, 2022, the company owned 51 operating properties, 2 additional properties under construction, and had 20 properties in its development pipeline. All of the company's properties are in the Washington metropolitan area, mostly in National Landing, almost all of which are accessible by the Washington Metro.

The company has a history of developing sustainable buildings and is a member of the U.S. Green Building Council. It helped develop the Leadership in Energy and Environmental Design (LEED) program for the design, construction, operation, and maintenance of green buildings, homes, and neighborhoods.

History
In late 1956, three attorneys — Gerald J. Miller, Donald A. Brown, and Joseph Bernard Gildenhorn — formed a law practice in Rockville, Maryland called Miller, Brown & Gildenhorn. By 1960, the firm stopped practicing law and instead began securing private loans from wealthy investors to finance building projects brought to them by real estate developers.

By 1962, the company controlled more than $50 million in real estate. Among the projects it completed in Washington, D.C. were a $4 million office building at 2121 Pennsylvania Avenue NW, the $2.7 million Jefferson Building at 19th Street NW and Jefferson Place NW, an $8.5 million office building at 19th and M Streets NW, and a $12 million large apartment complex at Tunlaw Road NW and Watson Place NW. That year, the company formed its own real estate development arm, MBG Associates. Benjamin A. Jacobs, a 23-year-old law student who expressed deep interest in the law firm's real estate practice, joined the real estate division.

In 1969, Miller was replaced with Jacobs and the company changed its name to JBG Associates.

In the late 1980s, the company was among the first real estate development firms in the D.C. area to redevelop properties for third-party clients for a set fee. This strategy helped the company survive the early 1990s recession.

The company aggressively acquired several properties after the early 1990s recession. With 26 buildings in its portfolio in the early 1990s, the company considered an initial public offering, although it did not happen.

By 1997, the company had an ownership interest in 21 commercial properties, including many office buildings, two hotels and one shopping center. It sold most of its assets to Trizec Properties in 1997 for $560 million. The deal did not include 10 apartment projects owned by JBG. The sale helped raise capital for the firm. But with a smaller portfolio, the company also shed most of its staff, and only 15 people remained with the firm and Brown and Gildenhorn retired from daily management.

In 1999,  the company decided on a new investment strategy, seeking individual, and later institutional, investors that gave the firm access to funds it could use at its discretion. The first investment fund closed in 2002, and its first institutional investor was the financial endowment of Yale University. By fall 2012, JBG had established 8 investment funds and raised $5.5 billion; several of the funds were specifically created just for investment by Yale.

In 2005, JBG recapitalized several office buildings by selling a stake in the buildings to Morgan Stanley for $644 million.

In August 2007, JBG sold most of its portfolio to MacFarlane Partners for $2 billion.

By 2011, the company had $10 billion in assets. That year, Jacobs retired as managing member. The firm had 15 owners by 2012, and more than 500 employees.

In 2013, the company was named as the most active real estate developer in the Washington, D.C. metropolitan area.

The company opened a real estate investment fund called JBG/Fund IX on March 17, 2014, and by September 2014, the company had raised $680 million.

In July 2017, the company merged with Charles E. Smith Companies, a subsidiary of Vornado Realty Trust that owned its assets in the Washington, D.C. metropolitan area. The company changed its name to JBG Smith and was spun off into a public company.

In November 2018, the company sold land with 4.1 million developable square feet to Amazon and announced lease transactions with Amazon at National Landing as part of the Amazon HQ2 initiative.

References

External links

1957 establishments in Maryland
2017 mergers and acquisitions
American companies established in 1957
Companies based in Bethesda, Maryland
Companies listed on the New York Stock Exchange
Financial services companies established in 1957
Real estate companies established in 1957
Real estate investment trusts of the United States